Yenikənd (previously known as Kirovka or Korevka) is a village in the municipality of Göylər in the Shamakhi Rayon of Azerbaijan.

References

Populated places in Shamakhi District